Jim Cummins may refer to:

Jim Cummins (photographer) (born 1944), American photographer
Jim Cummins (reporter) (1945–2007), American television reporter
Jim Cummins (ice hockey) (born 1970), professional ice hockey player
Jim Cummins (professor), instructor at the University of Toronto

See also
James Cummins (disambiguation)
James Cummings (disambiguation)
Jim Cummings (born 1952), American voice actor and singer